Cookin is an album by Paul Gonsalves, released in 1957 by Argo Records. The album was re-released on CD in 2008 with bonus tracks from Clark Terry's Out on a Limb with Clark Terry (Argo, 1957) and The Jazz School (EmArcy, 1956) by Fresh Sound.

Reception

AllMusic awarded the album 4 stars. The authors of Penguin Guide, reviewing a GRP Clark Terry compilation (Daybreak Express, also containing the Clark Terry album, 4 stars), wrote that the tracks with Gonsalves "are far and away the most interesting things on the record".

Track listing
All compositions by Paul Gonsalves, except as indicated
 "Festival" - 6:54    
 "Clark's Bars" (Clark Terry) - 3:38    
 "Daddy-O's Patio" (Terry) - 2:16    
 "Blues" - 5:01    
 "Impeccable" - 4:20    
 "Paul's Idea" - 2:48    
 "Phat Bach" (Terry) - 3:18    
 "Milli Terry" (Terry) - 2:34    
 "Funky" (Terry) - 4:04

Personnel
Paul Gonsalves - Tenor saxophone
Clark Terry - Trumpet
Willie Jones - Piano
Jimmy Woode - Bass
Sam Woodyard - drums

References 

1957 albums
Paul Gonsalves albums
Argo Records albums
Albums produced by Leonard Chess